Bottazzi is an Italian surname. Notable people with the surname include:

Antonio Bottazzi (died 1870), Italian painter
Filippo Bottazzi (1867–1941), Italian biochemist 
Guillaume Bottazzi (born 1971), French visual artist
Luca Bottazzi (born 1963), former Italian tennis player
Maria Elena Bottazzi, American biologist

Italian-language surnames